The fear of trains is anxiety and fear associated with trains, railways, and railway travel.

Psychoanalysis
Psychonalysts, starting from Sigmund Freud, associated sensations towards travel by train with sexuality. In 1906, Freud wrote that the link between railway travel and sexuality derives from the pleasurable sensation of shaking during the travel. Therefore, in the event of repression of sexuality the person will experience anxiety when confronted with railway travel. Karl Abraham  interpreted the fear of the uncontrollable motion of a train as a projection of the fear of uncontrolled sexuality. Wilhelm Stekel (1908) also associated train phobia with rocking sensation, but in addition to libido repression, he associated it with the embarrassment with the reminiscences of the rocking sensation of the early childhood.

Other considerations
Freud himself was suffering a kind of train anxiety, as he confessed in a number of letters. He used the term "Reiseangst" for it, which literally means "fear of travel" but it was recognized it was primarily associated with the travel by train, and some translators translated Freud's "Reiseangst" as  "railroad phobia" However Freud's anxiety was not classified as a "true" phobia, since once the travel started, the anxiety disappeared, and in fact, Freud traveled much and liked it.

Regardless of sexuality, since early days various authors associated the uncontrollable movement of the train with the fear of derailment, or a catastrophe.

Another source of fear in the early days of railway travel was travelers' isolation from the outside world, as well as the confinement in a small compartment, rendering a person who became sick or subject to crime, helpless. "...The loudest screams are swallowed up by the roar of the rapidly revolving wheels...". This kind of fear, as well as actual crimes committed in trains, were often a matter of newspaper publications of the times. After a number of prominent cases this fear was elevated to the level of collective psychosis. Public fear about rail travel  was heightened after British surgeon John Eric Erichsen described a post-traumatic diagnosis known as railway spine or "Erichsen's disease". People diagnosed with this had no obvious injury and were rejected as fake. Nowadays it is known that traffic accidents may cause post-traumatic stress disorder.

Alternative names and etymology
It has been variously called "train phobia", "railroad phobia", "dread of railway travel", etc. The German term "Eisenbahnangst" used, e.g., by Sigmund Freud was literally converted into Greek as "siderodromophobia" (Eisen = sideron = iron, Bahn = dromos = way, Angst = phobos = fear). In cases when this anxiety exceeds the social norms of a realistic fear, this anxiety may be classified as a specific phobia about trains. Campbell's Psychiatric Dictionary puts the fear of trains under the "vehicle phobia", together with fears of boats, airplanes, automobiles, and other forms of transportation.

Cultural references
A 1913 short story Terror by Jun'ichirō Tanizaki is a first-person narrative of a young man suffering of the morbid fear of travel in trains and streetcars. Tanizaki uses the German word Eisenbahnkrankheit, "railroad sickness".

See also
Other travel-related anxieties include:
Fear of air travel
Fear of sea travel
Driving phobia

Other transport-related disorders include:
Transport tetany in animals, also known as "railroad disease" or "railroad sickness"
Travel sickness in humans; in the late 1800s a "railroad sickness" (:de:Eisenbahnkrankheit) was frequently diagnosed

References

External links
The Victorian Belief That a Train Ride Could Cause Instant Insanity - Atlas Obscura
Early Trains Were Thought to Make Women's Uteruses Fly Out|Mental Floss

Phobias
Freudian psychology
Trains